A Flash of Light may refer to:
 A Flash of Light (film)
 A Flash of Light (Homeland)